Bhujangasana (IAST: Bhujaṅgāsana) or Cobra Pose is a reclining back-bending asana in hatha yoga and modern yoga as exercise. It is commonly performed in a cycle of asanas in Surya Namaskar, Salute to the Sun, as an alternative to Urdhva Mukha Svanasana, Upward Dog Pose. The Yin Yoga form is Sphinx Pose.

Etymology and origins

The name Bhujangasana comes from the Sanskrit words भुजंग bhujaṅga, "cobra" and आसन āsana, "posture" or "seat", from the resemblance to a cobra with its hood raised and was described in the 17th century hatha yoga text Gheranda Samhita in chapter 2, verses 42–43. In the 19th century Sritattvanidhi, the pose is named सरपासन Sarpāsana, "Serpent Pose", from सरप, sarpa[m], "serpent" or "snake". It is described and illustrated in halftone as Bhujangasana in the 1905 Yogasopana Purvacatuska.

Urdhva Mukha Shvanasana ( IAST: Urdhva mukha śvānāsana) is from the Sanskrit ऊर्ध्व Urdhva, "upwards"; मुख Mukha, "face"; and श्वान Shvana, "dog". The pose is one of those (along with Downward Dog) introduced by Krishnamacharya in the mid-20th century from Surya Namaskar, Salute to the Sun. That exercise was not until then considered to be yoga. It was later taught by his pupils Pattabhi Jois and B. K. S. Iyengar.

Description

The pose may be entered from a prone position or from Downward Dog. The palms are placed under the shoulders, pushing down until the hips lift slightly. The backs of the feet rest on the ground, the legs outstretched; the gaze is directed forwards, giving the preparatory pose. For the full pose, the back is arched until the arms are straight, and the gaze is directed straight upwards or a little backwards. In Bhujangasana the legs remain on the ground, whereas in Upward Dog the hips, thighs and knees are lifted slightly off the ground. Salabhasana, Locust pose, or Sphinx pose can be used to prepare for bhujangasana.

Bhujangasana is part of the sequence of yoga postures in some forms of Surya Namaskar, the Salute to the Sun. Balasana, child's pose, is a counter pose for bhujangasana.

Variations

An easier variant is Sphinx Pose, sometimes called Salamba Bhujangasana (षलम्ब भुजंगासन), in which the forearms rest on the ground, giving a gentler backbend. It is used in the long holds of Yin Yoga, either with the forearms on the ground or with the arms straightened.

Advanced practitioners may fold the legs into Padmasana (lotus).

The pose can be modified, for instance, in pregnancy, by placing a blanket under the pelvis.

Urdhva Mukha Shvanasana, Upward Dog, is entered with an inhalation from a prone position (or from Chaturanga Dandasana or Ashtanga Namaskara in a Surya Namaskar cycle), taking the feet a little apart. The legs are stretched out straight, the toes out (not tucked under), and the weight of the body is supported on the hands with outstretched arms so the hips are off the ground. The gaze is directed straight upwards, so the neck and back are arched.

See also
 Makarasana, Crocodile pose, reclining

References

Sources

Backbend asanas
Medieval Hatha Yoga asanas

ru:Растягивающие асаны#Бхуджангасана